John Thomas Whitehouse (1878 – 1933) was an English footballer who played in the Football League for Stoke and Wolverhampton Wanderers.

Career
Whitehouse was born in West Bromwich and played for Wednesbury Town before joining Wolverhampton Wanderers in 1901. He became a regular for Wolves at right half making over 150 appearances for the club scoring once which came in the FA Cup against Derby County in February 1904. He left Wolves in 1906 for Halesowen Town but was give the chance to remain a professional with Stoke. However, he only played two matches for Stoke in 1906–07 and went on to play for serveal non-league teams in the Birmingham area.

Career statistics
Source:

References

1878 births
1933 deaths
Sportspeople from West Bromwich
Association football wing halves
English footballers
Wednesbury Town F.C. players
Wolverhampton Wanderers F.C. players
Halesowen Town F.C. players
Stoke City F.C. players
Stourbridge F.C. players
Bloxwich Strollers F.C. players
Darlaston Town F.C. players
Dudley Town F.C. players
English Football League players